Luca Mantovani (born 7 October 1968) is an Italian ice dancing coach and former competitor. With Anna Croci, he is the 1987 Grand Prix International St. Gervais champion, 1990 Nations Cup bronze medalist, and 1992 Lysiane Lauret Challenge bronze medalist. The two represented Italy at the 1992 Winter Olympics.

Personal life 
Mantovani was born 7 October 1968 in Monza, Italy. He is married to former single skater Tony Bombardieri.

Career 
Mantovani competed for at least eight seasons with Anna Croci. During their career, they were coached by Tatiana Tarasova, Natalia Linichuk, Muriel Boucher-Zazoui, and Joan Slater.

Croci/Mantovani made their ISU Championship debut at the 1985 Junior Worlds, where they placed 12th. Two years later, they finished fourth at the 1987 Junior Worlds in Kitchener, Ontario.

Croci/Mantovani competed at three European Championships—placing as high as 8th, in 1990 (Leningrad)—and four World Championships, achieving their best result, 13th, in 1992 (Oakland, California). They were named in Italy's team to the 1992 Winter Olympics in Albertville; the duo finished 13th in France after placing 13th in both compulsory dances, 13th in the original dance, and 12th in the free dance.

Mantovani is a coach at S.S.D. S.r.l. Icelab in Bergamo.

Competitive highlights 
With Croci

References 

1968 births
Figure skaters at the 1992 Winter Olympics
Figure skating coaches
Italian male ice dancers
Living people
Sportspeople from Monza
Olympic figure skaters of Italy